Eupterote citrina is a moth in the family Eupterotidae. It was described by Francis Walker in 1855. It is found in India.

The wingspan is 50–84 mm. The wings are uniform pale yellowish white.

References

Moths described in 1855
Eupterotinae